"Somebody to You" is a song by British pop rock band The Vamps. A version featuring American singer Demi Lovato was released in the United Kingdom on 18 May 2014 as the fourth single from their debut studio album, Meet the Vamps (2014). The song peaked at number 4 on the UK Singles Chart, becoming the group's fourth successive top 5 single in the United Kingdom. It also peaked at number 10 in The Republic of Ireland and South Africa, as well as number 14 in Australia, their highest-charting single to date in the country.

The song was released as the band's first official single in the United States, alongside their debut extended play (EP) Somebody to You, released on 4 August 2014, but failed to chart on the Billboard Hot 100. However, the EP charted at number 10 on the Billboard 200.

Music video
The official music video was uploaded on YouTube on 9 June 2014. The video was directed by Emil Nava and shot in Malibu, California. The video is about a young girl (played by Laura Marano) who spends time with her friends in the summer until they are joined by The Vamps, and their group's lead singer (Bradley Simpson) falls in love with the girl. Demi Lovato appears as the guest vocals in the video.

Live performances
The Vamps and Lovato first performed the song live on The Ellen DeGeneres Show, on 10 November 2014.

Track listings
 Digital download
 "Somebody to You"  – 3:03

 Digital download – Acoustic version
 "Somebody to You"  – 3:01

 Digital download – EP
 "Somebody to You"  – 4:45

 "Can We Dance"  – 3:44
 "Sweater Weather" – 3:16

 CD1
 "Somebody to You" – 3:03
 "Midnight Memories" 
 "That Girl"
 "On the Floor"

 CD2
 "Somebody to You" 
 "Rough Night" 

 DVD
 "Somebody to You"  – 3:03
 "Carry on Vamping: A Day on Tour"

Charts

Weekly charts

Year-end charts

Certifications

References

The Vamps (British band) songs
Demi Lovato songs
2014 songs
2014 singles
Virgin EMI Records singles
Mercury Records singles
Number-one singles in Scotland
Songs written by Carl Falk
Songs written by Savan Kotecha
Songs written by Kristian Lundin